Sun Simiao (died 682) was a Chinese physician and writer of the Sui and Tang dynasty. He was titled as China's King of Medicine (Yaowang) for his significant contributions to Chinese medicine and tremendous care to his patients.

Books

Sun wrote two books - Beiji qianjin yaofang ("Essential Formulas for Emergencies [Worth] a Thousand Pieces/Catty of Gold") and Qian Jin Yi Fang ("Supplement to the Formulas of a Thousand Gold Worth") - that were both milestones in the history of Chinese medicine, summarizing pre-Tang dynasty medicine. The former listed about 5300 recipes for medicines, and the latter 2000. He also put forth the “Thirteen measures to keep health”, which claimed that actions like touching hair, rolling eyes, walking, and shaking heads improved health. Apart from this, he is known for the text "On the Absolute Sincerity of Great Physicians," often called "the Chinese Hippocratic Oath," or called "Dayi Heart", which comes from the first chapter of the first of the above-mentioned two books. This portion of the book is still a required reading for Chinese physicians. The following is an excerpt of the text:
A Great Physician should not pay attention to status, wealth or
age; neither should he question whether the particular person
is attractive or unattractive, whether he is an enemy or friend,
whether he is a Chinese or a foreigner, or finally, whether he is
uneducated or educated. He should meet everyone on equal
grounds. He should always act as if he were thinking of his
close relatives. 

The work Essential Subtleties on the Silver Sea (yínhǎi jīngwēi) was probably written by Sun Simiao. It was published at the end of the Yuan Dynasty (1271−1368) and has had wide influence on the Chinese ophthalmology until today.

In addition to his medical work, Sun also experimented in Chinese waidan external alchemy and may have been an initiated Daoist adept. The sinologist Nathan Sivin says Sun Simiao's famous Danjing yaojue  "Essential Formulas of Alchemical Classics"
… is as close to a modern laboratory handbook as anything we are likely to find in ancient literature. Following a preface and a catalogue of elixir names, there is a set of detailed specifications for necessities of the laboratory, including the liuyini  "six-one" lute which was universally employed in Chinese pharmacology and alchemy for the hermetical sealing of reaction vessels. Finally, there are the recipes themselves: ingredients grouped at the beginning, with weight and advance preparation clearly noted, and perspicacious, concise directions for compounding and using the products.

References

Bibliography

External links
Sun Simiao: Author of the Earliest Chinese Encyclopedia for Clinical Practice — Subhuti Dharmananda

682 deaths
7th-century Chinese physicians
7th-century Chinese writers
Chinese centenarians
Men centenarians
Chinese medical writers
Chinese non-fiction writers
Sui dynasty physicians
Sui dynasty writers
Northern Wei people
Northern Zhou people
Physicians from Shaanxi
Tang dynasty science writers
Writers from Tongchuan